London Super Comic Convention was an annual comic book convention dedicated to comics that was mounted from 2012 to 2017.

In its inaugural year 2012, Stan Lee was its main guest. It has since drawn in the likes of J. Scott Campbell, Neal Adams, George Pérez, Dave Gibbons, Dan Slott, Charlie Adlard, Max Brooks and Jonathan Ross.

Dealers from across the UK and USA came to sell their products and promote their businesses. There was also a large small press section and an active cosplay contingent, culminating with the LSCC London Super Costume Championship, judged by special guests.

The London Super Comic Convention mounted conventions from 2012 to 2017. After not mounting a show in 2018, the convention announced in March 2019 that it had merged forces with Reed Exhibitions and the MCM London Comic Con, thus bringing the LSCC to a close.

Location and dates

LSCC London Super Costume Championship Winners

See also
 List of comic book conventions
 List of multigenre conventions

References

External links

 

Comics conventions
Events in London
Defunct comics conventions
British fan conventions
Recurring events established in 2012